Nicolae Dandiș (born June 6, 1981) is a Moldovan lecturer at Bogdan Petriceicu Hasdeu State University and social activist. Since July 2015 Mayor of Cahul, running as an independent candidate. He is considered a pro-European, centre-right politician. Bachelor of Administrative Science, Bachelor of Science in History, Master of Management and Public Policy, Political Science PhD.

References

External links 
 web-site of Cahul city hall

Mayors of places in Moldova
1981 births
Living people